Clifty Creek is a stream in eastern Douglas and southeastern Wright counties of Missouri. It is a tributary of the North Fork River.

Clifty Creek source is in a valley in the southeast corner of Wright County just southeast of the intersection of State Route 95 and State Route AD south of Mountain Grove. The stream flows south into Douglas County and passes under Missouri Route 76 northwest of Vanzant then turns southeast and flows through several incised meanders before its confluence with the North Fork a short distance south of Topaz.

Clifty Creek was named for the cliffs along its course.

See also
List of rivers of Missouri

References

Rivers of Douglas County, Missouri
Rivers of Wright County, Missouri
Rivers of Missouri